Jack's Point is a luxury estate in Central Otago, New Zealand, covering 1,200 hectares of land. It is located 6 km south of Queenstown, at the foot of The Remarkables and close to the edge of Lake Wakatipu. It is known for its golf course. It is rated among the top 10 lifestyle estates in the world.

The settlement is a new development, planned to eventually consist of some 1300 houses and looking to serve a population of 7,000. It takes its name from "Maori Jack" Tewa, a local 19th century personality.

Demographics

Jack's Point had a population of 969 at the 2018 New Zealand census, an increase of 732 people (308.9%) since the 2013 census, and an increase of 906 people (1438.1%) since the 2006 census. There were 321 households. There were 501 males and 468 females, giving a sex ratio of 1.07 males per female. The median age was 35.7 years (compared with 37.4 years nationally), with 270 people (27.9%) aged under 15 years, 126 (13.0%) aged 15 to 29, 510 (52.6%) aged 30 to 64, and 63 (6.5%) aged 65 or older.

Ethnicities were 91.0% European/Pākehā, 3.4% Māori, 1.2% Pacific peoples, 5.9% Asian, and 2.8% other ethnicities (totals add to more than 100% since people could identify with multiple ethnicities).

The proportion of people born overseas was 33.7%, compared with 27.1% nationally.

Although some people objected to giving their religion, 62.5% had no religion, 30.0% were Christian, 0.6% were Hindu, 0.3% were Muslim, 0.3% were Buddhist and 2.2% had other religions.

Of those at least 15 years old, 261 (37.3%) people had a bachelor or higher degree, and 39 (5.6%) people had no formal qualifications. The median income was $59,100, compared with $31,800 nationally. 267 people (38.2%) earned over $70,000 compared to 17.2% nationally. The employment status of those at least 15 was that 438 (62.7%) people were employed full-time, 126 (18.0%) were part-time, and 6 (0.9%) were unemployed.

Golf 
The community's 18-hole, 6,388 metre golf course is situated along the Jack's Point ridge.

Trails 
Various trails, including a Grade 4 trail, are also available in the community.

Wastewater Collection, Treatment and Reuse 
Jacks Point has an Orenco Prelos (pressurised liquid only sewer) & Advantex wastewater treatment Plant.
This system includes Prelos interceptor tanks on each property, pressure sewer network, Orenco AdvanTex rtPBR (recirculating textile packed bed reactor) wastewater treatment plant with advanced nutrient reduction, followed by UV disinfection and subsurface drip irrigation in the surrounding pastures.
The system has been installed in stages - as the development phases are rolled out.

References

Queenstown-Lakes District
Populated places in Otago
Populated places on Lake Wakatipu